Lee Joo-myung (born December 1, 1993) is a South Korean actress and model. She debuted in the television and film industry with My Fellow Citizens! (2019) and is best known for her roles in Kairos (2020) and Twenty-Five Twenty-One (2022).

Life and career 

Lee Joo-myung was born on December 1, 1993, in South Korea.

In 2016, Lee began her career as a model and first acted in the music video entitled "Don't Leave" (떠나지마; tteonajima) by Yang Da-il. This prompted her desire to further act with dialogues, and so, debuted as an actress with the KBS2 television series My Fellow Citizens! (2019).

Other ventures

Endorsements 
In October 2020, Lee was selected as an endorsement model for South Korean make-up brand, Hince. A representative from the brand stated: "We believe the sensuous and sophisticated atmosphere of Lee Joo-myung fits the image of the brand well. We look forward to the future activities."

In September 2022, the global fashion brand Mango Tail selected Lee as the first Korean model. A brand official said, "Actress Lee Ju-myeong's unique and fashionable charm and dignified attitude matched the image pursued by the brand, so I was selected as the first Korean model. I look forward to it.”

Filmography

Television series

Radio shows

Music video appearances

Discography

Soundtrack appearances

Awards and nominations

References

External links 
 

1993 births
21st-century South Korean actresses
Living people
South Korean television actresses
YG Entertainment artists